Mohammed Mulibah Sherif (born 16 April 1975) is the General Manager of regional transmission company TRANSCO CLSG (Côte d'Ivoire, Liberia, Sierra Leone, Guinee) based in Abidjan, Côte d'Ivoire. He is an economist and project management specialist. He is recognized for his role in Liberia’s debt relief through the Heavily Indebted Poor Countries (HIPC) process and also for helping to stabilize the Liberian economy from the effects of a prolonged civil conflict. He is married with five children.

Sherif is former Chief Economist of the Republic of Liberia and is credited for coordinating several project activities that yielded dividends for the implementation of Liberia’s foremost development agenda - Agenda for Transformation. He successfully coordinated activities of the Macro Fiscal Unit at the Ministry of Finance, Republic of Liberia. He is a graduate from the Usmanu Danfodiyo University from 1999 to 2002, where he earned a Bachelor of Arts Degree with concentration in Statistics.

Sherif also provided leadership on several high-level meetings for the Government of Liberia including the West African Monetary Zone (WAMZ), the spring and annual meetings of the World Bank and International Monetary Fund (IMF). He traveled extensively on behalf of the Government of Liberia on several high-level conferences/meetings which brought in financial resources to boost development in the post-conflict country.

Early childhood, education & experience

On April 16, 1975, Mohammed Mulbah Sherif was born in Voinjama, Lofa County, Liberia to the late Mr. and Mrs. Mulibah Sherif. He spent his early childhood years in Yekepa, Nimba County where he also started his formal education at the St. Francis Elementary school and the United Muslim Junior high school.

Following the Civil War in 1990, Mohammed Sherif moved to Monrovia, the Liberian capital and attended the College of West Africa in 1994. He later fled to Nigeria as a result of the outbreak of war on April 6, 1996. While in Nigeria, he attended the Usmanu Danfodiyo University from 1999 to 2002, earning a Bachelor of Arts Degree in Statistics. He moved to Ghana and spent a year before returning to Liberia in 2004, and started work at the Ministry of Finance from 2004 - 2006 as an Administrative Assistant and then Economist.

In November 2006, Mohammed Sherif pursued his graduate studies in Economic Policy and Management at the UN Institute for Economic Development and Planning, Dakar, Senegal where he earned an MA Degree in Economic Policy and Management in 2008. After graduating, he was recruited as Senior Economist from November 2008 to August 2010 with the African Development Bank (AfDB) Institutional Support program to the Ministry of Finance of Liberia. He was subsequently promoted as Principal Economist in August 2010 to January 2012. Sherif received professional training from a host of Universities including Duke University, USA; Harvard School of professional Education, USA; IMF Institute, USA; World Bank Institute in Washington DC, USA; He taught Business Statistics for four years and Public Finance for one year at the University of Liberia graduate program in Public Financial Management.

Before ascending to his new position as General Manager of TRANSCO CLSG in September 2014, Mohammed Sherif worked as Chief Economist of Liberia at the Ministry of Finance from February 2012 – June 2014. In his professional career at the Ministry of Finance, Liberia, he played key role in the development of successful strategic programs in Liberia including the Poverty Reduction Strategy Paper (2008–2011), Agenda for Transformation (2012–2017), Liberia Public Finance Law of 2009 and took a technical lead role in the development of five Budget Framework Papers that underpinned Liberia's medium term budgets beginning fiscal year 2010/2011 up to 2014/15. Mohammed  Sherif also worked on the Medium Term Debt Management Strategy of 2013, and Risks Analysis Strategy for budget execution of 2013/14. He served as the Energy sector focal person at the Ministry of Finance from 2008–2014.

Mohammed Sherif also effectively coordinated the reporting requirements of the International Monetary Fund (IMF), Poverty Reduction and Growth Facility/Extended Credit Facility Program in Liberia from 2008 that led to Liberia achieving debt waiver under the Heavily Indebted Poor countries process in 2010. He also coordinated negotiations of a new IMF ECF program covering 2013–2015. He was involved in the preparation of various country Assistance strategies from 2009 to 2013, with multilateral institutions including the World Bank and the African Development Bank (AfDB). He directly participated in the negotiations of many credit agreements for Liberia including International Development Association (IDA) credits.

As the General Manager of TRANSCO CLSG, Mohammed Sherif has earned himself a place among young African leaders who are making strives to transform their countries into fast growing economies. He remained a great asset to the government of Liberia until his ascendance to the top position at the TRANSCO CLSG (Côte d'Ivoire, Liberia, Sierra Leone and Guinea) which is interconnecting these countries to allow mutually beneficial power exchanges and a reliable electricity supply necessary for economic growth and consolidating the fragile peace that has been achieved so far in these countries.

Meeting the challenges 

Mohammed M. Sherif arrived at TRANSCO CLSG with the desire to ensure affordable electricity is restored to millions of people in the Mano River Union. His vision for the future of TRANSCO CLSG is in line with the growing aspirations of the African continent. He plans to build on the successes of West African Power Pool (WAPP) and commit it to inclusive growth that boosts prosperity in the region, a support that will engender developing industries and increase employment as the route to poverty reduction. "My vision for what TRANSCO CLSG can do for Africa, is creating a cheaper, more reliable, more expansive energy network. Additionally I envisage a starting point for efforts in future cooperation, pooling risks, sharing costs, and gaining for economies of scale," said Sherif.

Mohammed Sherif believes that beyond 2017, the region will see a commercially viable company that is effective and efficient in ensuring the uninterrupted supply of affordable electricity within the CLSG and in ECOWAS.

TRANSCO CLSG

In January, 2006, Members of the Economic Community of West African States (ECOWAS) established articles of agreement establishing a new West African Power Pool (WAPP) organization. The objective of the WAPP is to establish a regional electricity market in West Africa through the development of key priority infrastructures that will permit accessibility to economic energy resources, to all member states of the ECOWAS. The Côte d'Ivoire – Liberia – Sierra Leone – Guinea Interconnection Project is one of the major sub-programs of the West Africa Power Pool (WAPP), with the aim to integrate the four post conflict countries into the same regional electricity market; by a high capacity transmission interconnection from Côte d'Ivoire to Guinea through Sierra Leone and Liberia. Supply of adequate and reliable electric power supply will improve security, good governance, the development of industry as well as improve the quality life of local communities.

Cote 'd'Ivoire, Liberia, Sierra Leone and Guinea are part of what many consider a flagship electricity project that could pay off handsomely for Sub-Saharan Africa - and spark an economic transformation for countries struggling to stay afloat. Andrew M Herscowitz, the Coordinator for US President Barack Obama's Power Africa and Trade Africa initiatives has said that investment in energy infrastructure in Africa will help unlock potential in what is already the world's fastest-growing continent, with positive results for global growth.

The CLSG's line is a 1,303 kilometer stretch, coming from Man to Danane; from Danane to Yekepa; from Yekepa to Buchanan; from Buchanan to Mount Coffee; from Mount Coffee to Bo Waterside, which provides huge opportunities for Liberia. The Economic Community of West African States (ECOWAS), through its West Africa Power Pool (WAPP) has made regional power grid access a priority for the next decade. Thus, the establishment of TRANSCO CLSG has created burgeoning opportunities across the region.

The WAPP intends to integrate the various national power systems into a unified regional electricity market - with the expectation that such mechanism would, over the medium to long-term, assure the citizens of ECOWAS member states a stable and reliable electricity supply at affordable costs, facilitating the balanced development of diverse energy resources for their collective economic benefit, through long-term energy sector cooperation, unimpeded energy transit and increasing cross-border electricity trade.

References

External links
 TRANSCO CLSG
 FrontpageAfrica http://www.frontpageafricaonline.com/index.php/news/6355-light-at-end-of-tunnel-electricity-integration-for-west-africa
 Finance Website
 [http://www.aljazeera.com/indepth/features/2012/06/201261912122040806.html Liberia's Long wait]

Living people
1975 births
Liberian businesspeople